The 2009 NAIA Division II Men’s Basketball national championship was held in March at Keeter Gymnasium in Point Lookout, Missouri.  The 18th annual NAIA basketball tournament featured 32 teams playing in a single-elimination format.

Awards and honors
tournament hustle award: Isaiah Peterson of Oklahoma Wesleyan
Rawlings Coach of the Year Award: Donnie Bostwick of Oklahoma Wesleyan
Emil Liston Team Sportsmanship Award: Indiana Wesleyan
Tournament most valuable player: Steve Briggs of Oklahoma Wesleyan
Leading scorer: Steve Briggs of Oklahoma Wesleyan

The All-Tournament Team consisted of the following players:
Steve Briggs-Oklahoma Wesleyan
Eric Gaff-Grace
Kyle Prochaska-Bellevue
Antonio Murrell-Indiana Wesleyan
Luke Enos-Black Hills State
William Walker-Bethel
Sadiel Rojas-Oklahoma Wesleyan
Jared Howerton-College of the Ozarks
Colt Blair-College of the Ozarks
Cory Stone-College of the Ozarks

Bracket

  * denotes overtime.

See also
2009 NAIA Division I men's basketball tournament
2009 NCAA Division I men's basketball tournament
2009 NCAA Division II men's basketball tournament
2009 NCAA Division III men's basketball tournament
2009 NAIA Division II women's basketball tournament

References

NAIA Men's Basketball Championship
Tournament
2009 in sports in Missouri